Mustapha Matura (17 December 1939 – 29 October 2019) was a Trinidadian playwright living in London. Characterised by critic Michael Billington as "a pioneering black playwright who opened the doors for his successors", Matura was the first British-based dramatist of colour to have a play in London's West End, with Play Mas in 1974. He was described by the New Statesman as "the most perceptive and humane of Black dramatists writing in Britain."

Early years

Born Noel Mathura in 1939, in Port of Spain, Trinidad, he changed his name when he became a writer, and explained: "I liked the sound of it.... It was the sixties."

Leaving the Caribbean, he travelled to England by ship in 1962, and after a year working as a hospital porter he and fellow Trinidadian Horace Ové went to Rome, where he worked on stage productions such as Langston Hughes' Shakespeare in Harlem. Matura thereafter decided to write plays about the West Indian experience in London.

Career
Matura's play As Time Goes By was first performed in 1971 at the Traverse Theatre Club in Edinburgh and in London at the Theatre Upstairs at the Royal Court, with a cast of Caribbean actors, including Stefan Kalipha, Alfred Fagon, Mona Hammond and Corinne Skinner-Carter. 

Play Mas was first performed at the Royal Court in 1974 (with Stefan Kalipha, Rudolph Walker, Norman Beaton and Mona Hammond in the cast), winning Matura the London Evening Standard’s Most Promising Playwright Award that year. It would be revived in 2015 at the Orange Tree Theatre, directed by Paulette Randall in what was described by The Guardian as a "beautifully observed production... a richly informative play that raises big questions about the nature of liberation, and is also hilariously precise about the shifting balance of power." The reviewer for The Arts Desk wrote: "It is surprising that this is the first major revival of Play Mas.... It is exuberant, funny and often charming."

Among Matura's subsequent plays were Rum and Coca Cola (1976), Another Tuesday (Institute of Contemporary Arts, 1978), More, More (The Factory, London, 1978), Independence (1979), A Dying Business (Riverside Studios, 1980); One Rule (Riverside Studios, 1981), Meetings (1981), Playboy of the West Indies (Oxford Playhouse, 1984; produced for BBC television, 1985), Trinidad Sisters (Tricycle Theatre, 1988) and The Coup (Royal National Theatre, 1991).

In 1978, he co-founded the Black Theatre Co-operative (now NitroBeat) together with British director Charlie Hanson. "Frustrated by the lack  of interest from London Fringe theatres in Matura's new play Welcome Home Jacko, Matura and Hanson set up their own theatre company. Welcome Home Jacko was presented at The Factory in Paddington, west London, in May 1979 and marked the beginnings of the Black Theatre Co-operative. The company supported, commissioned and produced work by black writers in Britain."

Matura's work for television includes the Channel 4 sitcom No Problem! (1983–85), written by him with Farrukh Dhondy, and Black Silk (BBC, 1985), which he devised in collaboration with Rudy Narayan.

Matura was also a poet, and in Bayswater, West London, in 1971 he performed his epic poem "Elae Elae Ghanga", and featured in an evening of poetry and music on Friday, 29 October, organised by the Caribbean Artists Movement, along with James Berry, T-Bone Wilson, Louis Marriott, Marc Matthews and Archie Markham.

Personal life and legacy

Matura's first marriage, to Marian Walsh, with whom he had two children (Dominic and Ann), ended in divorce. He was subsequently married to Ingrid Selberg, daughter of Norwegian mathematician Atle Selberg, with whom he had two children, Cayal and Maya.

Matura died aged 79 on 29 October 2019, in St. John's, Newfoundland and Labrador, after having a heart attack on a flight from New York where he was visiting a grandchild. A celebration of his life and work was held on 8 March 2020 at the Young Vic, directed and curated by Nicolas Kent, Anton Phillips and Paulette Randall.

A musical adaptation of Playboy of the West Indies created by Matura, Clement Ishmael, Dominique Le Gendre and Nicholas Kent opened at the Birmingham Repertory Theatre in June 2022 as part of the Birmingham 2022 Festival.

Selected works

Black Pieces (ICA, 1970, dir. Roland Rees)
As Time Goes By (1971)
Bakerloo Line (Almost Free Theatre, 1972; performed on BBC2 Full House, 1973)
Nice (Almost Free Theatre, 1973)
Play Mas (1974)
Rum and Coca Cola (Royal Court Theatre and off-Broadway, 1976)
 Another Tuesday (Institute of Contemporary Arts, 1978)
 More, More (The Factory, London, 1978)
Independence (1979)
Welcome Home Jacko (The Factory, London, 1978)
 A Dying Business (Riverside Studios, 1980)
 One Rule (Riverside Studios, 1981)
Meetings (1981; Hampstead Theatre, 1982)
Playboy of the West Indies (1984)
Trinidad Sisters (based on Chekhov's Three Sisters; 1988) 
The Coup (Cottesloe Theatre, 1991)

Bibliography
 Matura: Six Plays: "As Time Goes By", "Nice", "Play Mas", "Independence", "Welcome Home Jacko" and "Meetings", Bloomsbury Publishing, 2007, 
 Three Sisters. After Chekhov, London: Oberon Books, 2006, 
 Playboy of the West Indies, Broadway Play Publishing Inc., 1989, . London: Oberon Books, 2010, 
 Moon Jump (illus. J. Gifford), Heinemann Young Books, 1988, 
 Meetings, New York: Samuel French, 1982, 
 Nice, Rum an' Coca Cola & Welcome Home Jacko: Three Plays, London: Eyre Methuen, 1980, 
 As Time Goes By, London: Marion Boyars Publishers Ltd, 1972, 

Contributor
 The Methuen Drama Book of Plays by Black British Writers, 2011.

Awards and honours
Matura received a number of awards and honours throughout his career, in the UK and in Trinidad, including:
 1971: The George Devine Award.
 1971: The John Whiting Award.
 1974: The Evening Standard Most Promising Playwright Award.
 1991: Trinidad National Award – the Scarlet Ibis Gold.
 1994: The Helen Hayes Award.
 2016: Honorary Fellowship of Goldsmiths, University of London.

References

Further reading
"'Ter Speak in yer mudder tongue': An interview with playwright Mustapha Matura" in Kwesi Owusu (ed.), Black British Culture & Society, Routledge, 2000.

External links
 Mustapha Matura's website 
 "Mustapha Matura: My London", Caribbean Beat, Issue 6 (Summer 1993).
 "Mustapha Matura", Honorary graduates, Goldsmiths University of London
 
 Mustapha Matura at Doollee

1939 births
2019 deaths
20th-century dramatists and playwrights
20th-century male writers
Black British writers
British writers of Indian descent
Trinidad and Tobago dramatists and playwrights
Trinidad and Tobago male writers
Trinidad and Tobago poets